The 1939 LSU Tigers football team represented Louisiana State University (LSU) in the 1939 college football season.

Schedule

Roster

Roster from Fanbase.com

References

LSU
LSU Tigers football seasons
LSU Tigers football